Hmwe Hmwe Khin is a Burmese politician who currently serves as Minister of Shan Ethnic Affairs  for Sagaing Region and Shan State Parliament MP for Shan .

Political career 
In the 2015 Myanmar general election, she was elected as a Sagaing Region Hluttaw MP, winning a majority of 32,958 votes, from  Shan  parliamentary constituency. She also serving as a Regional Minister of Shan Ethnic Affairs  for Sagaing Region .

References

Tai-Leng Nationalities Development Party politicians
Living people
People from Shan State
Members of legislatures of Burmese states and regions
Year of birth missing (living people)